Barro Negro may refer to:

 Barro negro pottery
 Barro Negro Tunebo language
 Barro Negro (volcano)